GVS may refer to:

 Galvanic vestibular stimulation
 Great Vowel Shift
 Gumawana language
 Yugo GVS, an automobile